Caesio teres, the yellow and blueback fusilier, beautiful fusilier, blue and gold fusilier or yellow-tail fusilier, is a species of marine, pelagic ray-finned fish belonging to the family Caesionidae. It occurs in the Indian and Western Pacific Oceans.

Taxonomy
Caesio teres was first formally described in 1906 by the American ichthyologist Alvin Seale with the type locality given as Shortland Island in the Solomon Islands. This species has been placed in the subgenus Flavicaesio. The specific name teres  means “cylindrical”, a reference to the cylindrical cross-section of the body compared to C. lunaris.

Description
Caesio teres has a moderately deep, fusiform and laterally compressed body. The dorsal fin has 10 spines and 14-16, typically 15, soft rays while the anal fin contains 3 spines and 12-13 soft rays. The pectoral fins contain 20-22, typically 21 rays. The upper back and the rear part of the dorsal fin are bright yellow with the remainder of the body being bright blue on the upper body and white ventrally. The pectoral fin is white with a black upper base, the pelvic and anal fins are white.

Distribution and habitat
Caesio teres has a wide tropical Indo-West Pacific distribution. It is found from the East African coast between Somalia and South Africa east into the Pacific as far as the Line and Tuamotu Islands, north to southern Japan south to the Great Barrier Reef. It is absent from the Red Sea and the Persian Gulf. In Australian waters this species is found at Rowley Shoals in Western Australia, at the Ashmore Reef in the Timor Sea, and from the northern Great Barrier Reef to Escape Reef, Queensland. It is also found  at Christmas Island and the Cocos (Keeling) Islands.

Biology
 
Caesio teres feeds on zooplankton. It is diurnal, and lives in groups and forms schools with other species of fusiliers such as Caesio xanthonota.The adults migrate to defined areas in The vicinity of the reef where they spawn close to the surface over and in the openings of deep channels during ebbing tides, the timing being governed by lunar cycles. It is an oviparous species which lays large numbers of small, pelagic eggs.

Fisheries
Caesio teres is targeted by fisheries in some parts of its distribution and frequently drive-in nets are used to catch it.

References

External links

 World Register of Marine Species
 Integrated Taxonomic Information System
 

teres
Fish described in 1906